Bone Creek flows into the Oquaga Creek by Deposit, New York.

References

Rivers of New York (state)
Rivers of Broome County, New York
Tributaries of the West Branch Delaware River